Hilda Gracia Baylor AM  (born 8 October 1929 in Brisbane) is an Australian retired politician. Baylor was one of the first two women elected to the Victorian Legislative Council in 1979, the other being Joan Coxsedge.

Gracia was born in Brisbane, her father was in the military and the family eventually settled in Victoria. She studied fine art and teaching, and taught in secondary schools until she married. Following her first marriage she worked as a law clerk and managed one of her husband's three law practices (Richard Baylor).

She became interested in local government when she noticed the lack of a kindergarten near her home. She was elected to the Healesville Shire council in 1966, and became Shire president from 1977 to 1978, she was the first female Shire president in Victoria. At the 1979 election, she was elected to Boronia Province in the Victorian Legislative Council as a member of the Liberal Party — one of the first two women elected to the Council alongside Joan Coxsedge (Labor, Melbourne West). She held her seat until 1985 when she resigned to contest a seat in the Legislative Assembly, but her bid was unsuccessful.

She has continued to be involved in women's issues, including a term as the president of the National Council of Women (1997–2000).

References

 Victorian Government, Office of Women's Policy. Victorian Honour Roll of Women, 2003

1929 births
Living people
Members of the Victorian Legislative Council
Mayors of places in Victoria (Australia)
Liberal Party of Australia members of the Parliament of Victoria
Members of the Order of Australia
Women members of the Victorian Legislative Council
Women mayors of places in Victoria (Australia)